Nathan Raphael Pelae Cardoso (born 13 May 1995), simply known as Nathan, is a Brazilian professional footballer who plays as a central defender for Major League Soccer club San Jose Earthquakes.

Honours
Palmeiras
Copa do Brasil: 2015

Chapecoense
Campeonato Catarinense: 2017

References

External links

1995 births
Living people
Footballers from São Paulo
Brazilian footballers
Association football defenders
Campeonato Brasileiro Série A players
Campeonato Brasileiro Série B players
Swiss Super League players
Swiss Challenge League players
Sociedade Esportiva Palmeiras players
Criciúma Esporte Clube players
Associação Chapecoense de Futebol players
Servette FC players
Grasshopper Club Zürich players
FC Zürich players
San Jose Earthquakes players
2015 South American Youth Football Championship players
Brazil youth international footballers
Brazil under-20 international footballers
Brazilian expatriate footballers
Brazilian expatriate sportspeople in Switzerland
Expatriate footballers in Switzerland
Brazilian expatriate sportspeople in the United States
Expatriate soccer players in the United States
Major League Soccer players